Endure is the eighth album by American electronic act Assemblage 23. It was released on August 28, 2016, on Metropolis Records.

Track listing
All original songs written, performed and produced by Tom Shear.

References

2016 albums
Assemblage 23 albums
Metropolis Records albums